Chains, written by Laurie Halse Anderson, is the first novel in the Seeds of America trilogy, a series of historical fiction novels, and was first published in the United States on October 21, 2008. The trilogy follows the story of thirteen-year-old Isabel, an African-American slave fighting for her and her younger sister's freedom during the American Revolutionary War. Chains takes place mainly in New York City in 1776 into 1777, at a time when slavery was legal and common in the colonies. The book is followed by sequels Forge (2010) and Ashes (2016). This book is also the subject of Academic Pentathlon's 2022-2023 Literature curriculum as one of the main works. 

Though the novel is fictional, parts of the story are inspired by and depict actual events that occurred during the early stages of the war, such as the failed plan of George Washington's assassination and the hanging of one of the conspirators, the capture of Fort Washington, and the popular pamphlet Common Sense by Thomas Paine.

The novel contains 45 chapters numbered in Roman Numerals with the dates of the events in the chapter appearing beneath the chapter number. Under the dates, Anderson includes quotes from important historic documents such as private letters, newspapers, the Common Sense pamphlet, the Declaration of Independence of the United States, and spoken opinions from various world leaders. These openings to each chapter give a perspective on what Isabel/Sal might face in the chapter.

Synopsis
Isabel and her younger sister, Ruth, were supposed to be released from slavery as promised by the will of their owner, Miss Mary Finch, when she died. Unfortunately, they landed in the hands of Miss Mary's nephew, Robert Finch, who claimed them as his property with the reason that there was no actual will in physical form. He then sold them to a Loyalist couple who brings them to New York away from their previous hometown, Newport, Rhode Island. Isabel, determined to gain her and her sister's liberty, follows the advice of a servant boy named Curzon, who tells her to spy on her master and other Loyalists for any suspicious plans that could be reported back to the Patriots to use against the Loyalists.

Characters

Isabel
The protagonist and narrator of the novel, she is always striving her best to do anything she can do to get her and her sister out of slavery and back to Rhode Island, where they belong. Though at a very young age—thirteen years old—she has a very tough character and is devoted to anything she does. Her cleverness helps her in her various tasks on spying the Loyalists and planning her escape. She is very nurturing towards her younger sister Ruth, knowing that she is the only person who can truly take care of her. She befriends a slave boy named Curzon who works for a Patriot, to whom she is a good friend he can always trust, which is shown when she desperately tried to deliver leftover food to Curzon, who is in prison; considering she knows the consequences of helping a Patriot when she herself is working for a Loyalist. She also shows a brave spirit when she stands up to Mrs. Lockton and demand the information on the whereabouts of Ruth, who Lockton said she has sold but in truth kept Ruth in hiding away from Isabel to weaken her. This action results in her being branded with I for insolence on her right cheek as a punishment for standing up to her master, but towards the end of the novel she sees this mark standing for her name Isabel, and is proud to have everyone know her name. On the night of the Queens Ball she makes her move on her way to freedom, bringing Curzon along with her.

Ruth
Isabel's five-year-old sister and also a slave. Ruth, who is suffering from epilepsy, often encounters fits from this sickness. She does not talk very often and does what she is told without question, which becomes the more desirable slave to Mrs. Lockton and she would be kept in Mrs. Lockton's chamber for hours to be her personal maid. As a young child, she is sometimes stubborn, for example she asks for her baby doll every night before going to bed even though she knows that Mr. Robert Finch has taken away all their belongings. Her innocent and vulnerable nature makes her very dependent on Isabel. She is sold to a different slave owner midway throughout the book.

The Locktons
The Locktons are the owners of Isabel and her sister Ruth throughout, pretty much the whole book. They are both loyalists and try their hardest to make the little girls' lives miserable.

Elihu Lockton
A Loyalist who is very self-centered and devious. His commitment to being a Loyalist is shown by his various attempts to get the rebels to join the British side; one of the attempts was to bribe them and hiding the money in his wife's linen chest to discourage suspicion. This attempt, however, was discovered thanks to Isabel's report on her spying tasks. He also had a plan to assassinate President George Washington along with a group of Loyalists; unfortunately, their plan was also discovered by Isabel. At home, he is very abusive towards his wife, and he demands to be obeyed by everybody in the house. He also has a big belly, according to the Narrator.

Anne Lockton
The main antagonist of Chains (and arguably the entire trilogy) and the wife of Elihu Lockton, she is also a Loyalist, though not as strongly committed as her husband. Very abusive towards Isabel, both physically and mentally, she does not call her by name and instead calls her Sal; in return demanding Isabel refers to her as Madam. Her harsh and brutal character is shown in her branding Isabel as a punishment for standing up to her and running away afterward. She strongly dislikes Isabel, as opposed to her liking Ruth because she is considered easier to order around. She is very impatient and she always blames Isabel for accidents she encounters, also often picking on the simplest mistakes such as not placing her dog statue in the right position after being dusted. When her husband's aunt falls sick, she hopes that her condition will cause her to die soon. Whenever Lady Seymour's condition improves, Mrs. Lockton seems to be saddened..

Miss Mary Finch
The previous owner of Isabel and Ruth before she died and they were sold to the Locktons. She promised Isabel that she and her sister would be free when she dies, as a part of her will. Isabel views her as one of the nicer slave owners, describing her as being polite to her slaves by saying please and thank you when assigning tasks. Along with those acts, she taught Isabel to read and write. She worked as a policeman for most of her life.

Robert Finch
Miss Finch's nephew and only relative. He denies Miss Mary's will by saying that it is verbal and not physically extant thus making it non-legal and claims that the death of Miss Mary would mean Isabel and Ruth belongs to him. He then sells the girls to the Locktons and takes away all of the girls' only belongings, including Ruth's favorite baby doll.

Curzon
A slave of Mr. Bellingham, a Patriot, he helps Isabel to achieve her wish for freedom by telling her to become a spy on the Locktons and try to find out any personal information that is sensitive to the political being, and report back. While other slaves join the Patriot army to be free from slavery, Curzon says that he is simply a loyal American fighting for the independence of his country; he is even brave enough to risk life imprisoned as long as he is fighting for America's liberty. He is a very good and loyal friend to Isabel, calling her "Country," and he is always helping her in her attempts to seek the liberation of her and her sister.

Mr. Bellingham
A patriot who is Curzon's master. He is supposed to join the army for the Rebels, however, he pays Curzon to do it for him, also suggesting for his freedom if he joins.

Lady Seymour
Elihu Lockton's aunt, is very kind to slaves, unlike the rest of the people of the society. She acquaints Isabel and welcomes her dearly, and she always helps Isabel whenever she needs it. When Isabel came to her house to pass the information that Mr. Lockton had been arrested and that Madam is in need of his aunt, she tells Isabel to come in the house and even serves her milk and cookies to nourish herself; something nobody at the time would do to slaves. She also took care of Isabel while in recovery right after getting branded, which in return was paid by Isabel helping her escape from the burning bush burning buildings and save her life.

Angelika
Angelika is Lady Seymour's servant who only speaks Dutch and does not show interest in learning English. She treated Isabel's wounds when Isabel woke up from being branded with the letter I for insolence.

Becky
She is a maid in the Lockton house, and she often helps Isabel whenever she is having tough times due to Mrs. Lockton's orders and actions. She reminds Isabel to do what Mrs. Lockton says, and she tells Isabel what and what not to do in the Lockton house. Becky also tries her best to get Isabel and Ruth out of situations where they would possibly get punished. She told Isabel about a slave who worked for the Locktons a couple of years earlier who got beaten severely for talking back to Madam, trying to get Isabel to stay cautious in her actions and hold her fists down.

Grandfather
He is an elder African-American slave who is in the line of the distribution of water from the Tea Water Pump. He seems to know much about the gossip of the war, which is passed around every morning when slaves come to the pump to obtain water for the day. His real name is not revealed, but most slaves refer to him as "Grandfather", because he is kind to everyone.

Colonel Regan
A colonel who works for Mr. Bellingham, he is Isabel's only hope to get her and her sister back to Rhode Islands. He retrieves information and evidence in the form of a list of names of the plan to assassinate General George Washington from Isabel, who secretly spied on Mr. Lockton during one of his meetings. He promised to help Isabel in return for the information, but he, later on, dismisses her when she begged for help when she ran away from Madam.

Captain Morse
Leader of the war prisoners of Fort Washington, he asks Isabel to be his messenger and bring messages from other military officers. He treats Isabel kindly and allows her to bring in food for Curzon, who was a prisoner in there. Captain Morse often takes some food from the basket that Isabel brings along.

Captain Farrar
A military officer who Isabel goes to in the midst of her task of being Captain Morse's personal messenger. He gives a note to Isabel which was demanded by Mrs. Lockton when she discovers that Isabel has been working for the rebels. Isabel surprisingly throws away the note in the hearth so that Mrs. Lockton would not be able to obtain the information in the note.

Pastor Weeks
A pastor that fulfills Isabel's parents funeral. He also helps Isabel with trying to get to a safe place, and where she would be best happy, even though she would still be a slave.

Old Ben
Pastor Week's horse who pulled the wagon carrying a pine coffin containing Miss Mary Finch's body at the beginning of the story.

Momma (Dinah)
Isabel and Ruth's mother who died when they were young from pox. Isabel sneaks her seeds when she gets sold to the Locktons.

Papa
He is the father of Isabel and Ruth and the husband of Dinah, their mother. He has tribal scars from when he lived in Africa, and Isabel compares her own scar to his toward the end of the book while confined to the potato bin, all alone.

Honors

 Selected by Indie Booksellers for the Winter 2008 Kid's List
 Selected in the Booklist Editor's Choice:Books for Youth in 2008
 National Book Award finalist in 2008
 Winner of the IRA Teacher's Choices booklist in 2009
 Winner of the Scott O'Dell Award for Historical Fiction in 2009
 Winner of the Top 10 Black History Books for Youth in 2009
 Winner of the Notable Children's Book Award by the Association of Library Service to Children in 2009

Bibliographiy

References

External links
 Chains (novel)

2008 American novels
Novels by Laurie Halse Anderson
American historical novels
Atheneum Books books